Deh Bal (also Romanized as Deh Bāl; also known as Vardeh) is a small village in Charam Rural District, in the Central District of Charam County, Kohgiluyeh and Boyer-Ahmad Province, Iran. At the 2006 census, its population was 23, in 4 families.

References 

Populated places in Charam County